"El baño" is a song by Spanish singer Enrique Iglesias,  featuring Puerto Rican rapper Bad Bunny. The track was written by Iglesias, Bad Bunny, Francisco Saldaña, Xavier Semper, Edgar Semper, Hasibur Rahman, Servando Primera and Luian Malavé. It was produced by Carlos Paucar and co-produced by Luny Tunes. The song was released by RCA Records and Sony Music Latin on 12 January 2018. A slightly cut version of the song was included as part of his album, Final Vol. 1. The final verse is missing, and there is a slight change in the first chorus. This version comes in at 3:34.

Composition
"El Baño" is a reggaeton song with elements of Latin pop and Latin trap.

Remixes
A remix featuring Dominican singer Natti Natasha was released on 9 March 2018.

Music video
The music video of the song was released on 12 January 2018 on Enrique Iglesias' Vevo account. The concept for the music video was created by Iglesias' longtime creative director and collaborator Yasha Malekzad. The video was produced by Artist Preserve.

Track listing

Charts

Weekly charts

Year-end charts

Certifications

See also
List of number-one songs of 2018 (Mexico)
List of Billboard number-one Latin songs of 2018

References

2018 singles
Enrique Iglesias songs
2018 songs
Sony Music Latin singles
Songs written by Enrique Iglesias
Spanish-language songs
Bad Bunny songs
Monitor Latino Top General number-one singles
Reggaeton songs
Songs written by Bad Bunny
Songs written by Francisco Saldaña
Songs written by Edgar Semper
Songs written by Xavier Semper